Canadian Forces Base Portage la Prairie is a former military airport of the Royal Canadian Air Force (RCAF) located adjacent to Portage la Prairie, Manitoba, Canada. Today the airport is operated as Portage la Prairie/Southport Airport.

History

World War II
RCAF Station Portage la Prairie was originally slated to open on 28 October 1940 and was to be the home station of No. 14 Elementary Flying Training School (EFTS). However, due to construction delays of the school from moving into the nearly completed aerodrome, it was decided that the school would be established at Stevenson Field in Winnipeg, Manitoba. From 28 October 1940 until 4 December 1940 the school operated out of the Winnipeg Aerodrome. The majority of EFTS were operated by civilian flying clubs and No. 14 EFTS was no different. Contract for the operation of this school was issued to Central Manitoba Flying Training School Limited, a company created under a charter issued to the Winnipeg Flying Club.

The school was initially tasked to start a pilot training course every month with the course slated to last two months. Each course was loaded with 24 students; however, by the time they commenced training, this increased to 35 students per course.

Training at this school was to be conducted using 25 RCAF provided de Havilland Tiger Moth training aircraft.

The school operated until July 1942 when it was disbanded to allow No.7 Air Observer School, which was also stationed at the base, to expand.

The station was a part of the British Commonwealth Air Training Plan.

The station was home to No.7 Air Observer School from 28 April 1941 to 31 March 1945.

When the Air Observer School's size was increased in the spring of 1942, No.14 EFTS was disbanded to make room. The station was closed on 31 March 1945.

Aerodrome data

Three runways were listed as follows:

Cold War (1952–92)
The post-war expansion of the RCAF resulted in RCAF Station Portage la Prairie being re-activated on 15 September 1952. No. 2 Advanced Flying School (No. 2 AFS) was established to train RCAF and NATO pilots. Several other flight schools followed over the succeeding decades.

As a result of the unification of the Canadian Armed Forces, the station was renamed CFB Portage la Prairie in 1966.

In the late 1980s, Department of National Defence budget reductions led to the contracting out of flight training to civilian agencies. As a result, CFB Portage la Prairie closed on 1 September 1992.

Post-base closure (1992–)
It reopened as Southport Airport, where 3 Canadian Forces Flying Training School continues to conduct flight training under contract with KF Aerospace.

References

 

Canadian Forces bases in Manitoba
Military installations closed in 1992
Defunct airports in Manitoba
1942 establishments in Manitoba
1992 disestablishments in Canada
Military airbases in Manitoba
Military history of Manitoba
Canadian Forces bases in Canada (closed)
Royal Canadian Air Force stations
Airports of the British Commonwealth Air Training Plan